Sheikh Zayed Medical College ( or SZMC), established in March 2003, is a public medical college located in Rahim Yar Khan, Punjab, Pakistan.

It is named in honor of Shaikh Zayed bin Sultan Al Nahyan. The Medical College is affiliated with Shaikh Zayed Hospital, Rahim Yar Khan which has 900 beds and is the biggest hospital of Rahim Yar Khan District.

Recognition  
 Recognized by Pakistan Medical & Dental Council for undergraduate & post graduate medical education. Every year, the college admits 150 students on open merit via entrance exam conducted by University of Health Sciences, Lahore.
 Accredited by the College of Physicians and Surgeons of Pakistan.
 Affiliated with the University of Health Sciences, Lahore.

History 
Shaikh Zayed Medical College was established in March 2003 in District Headquarter Hospital (now Shaikh Zayed Hospital) Rahim Yar Khan. Professor Dr Eice Muhammad was its founding principal.

Affiliated Institutes 
 Shaikh Zayed Hospital Rahim Yar Khan (previously known as District Head Quarter Hospital)
 College of Nursing Shaikh Zayed Medical College Rahim Yar Khan

Official Publication 
Journal of Sheikh Zayed Medical College (JSZMC) is serving as a center for Health Research Publication in the Institute and Region, under Research & Development Support Unit, Sheikh Zayed Medical College / Hospital, Rahim Yar Khan. JSZMC is a peer reviewed, scientific Journal published regularly and timely since 2010. It is recognized by Pakistan Medical & Dental Council, Islamabad. JSZMC is also a member of Pakistan Association of Medical Editors (PAME). We follow the guidelines according to “Uniform Requirements for manuscript submitted to biomedical Journals: International Committee of Medical Journal Editors (ICMJE)”.

Undergraduate programs 
The College is offering following under-graduate programs recognized by Pakistan Medical & Dental Council, Pakistan Nursing Council & University of Health Sciences.;

 MBBS
 Doctor of Physical Therapy
 BSc (Operation Theater Technology)
 BSc (Medical laboratory technology)
 BSc Hons. (Medical Imaging Technology)
 Nursing Diploma

Post Graduate Programs 
Shaikh Zayed Medical College & its affiliated institutes are recognized by Pakistan Medical & Dental Council, College of Physicians & Surgeons of Pakistan & University of Health Sciences and is offering training in following;

 MS
 MD
 FCPS
 MCPS

Admission in these programs is through Central Induction Policy under Punjab Residency Program.

Departments
Basic science departments
Anatomy
Biochemistry
Community medicine
Forensic medicine
Pathology
Pharmacology
Physiology
Medicine and allied departments
Cardiology
Dermatology
General medicine
Neurology
Pediatrics
Preventive medicine
Psychiatry
Pulmonology (Chest medicine)
Radiotherapy
Urology
Surgery and allied departments
Anesthesiology
Cardiac surgery
Cosmetic surgery
General surgery
Neurosurgery
Obstetrics and gynaecology
Ophthalmology
Oral and maxillofacial surgery
Orthopedics
Otorhinolaryngology
Pediatric surgery
Radiology

Student Societies 
Sheikh Zayed Medical College has the following societies working for students:
 Zayedians Awareness and Literary Society(ZALS)
 Zayedians Media Arts and Dramatics(ZMAD)
 Zayedians Athletic and Sports Club(ZASC)
 Zayedians Blood Donor Society (ZBDS)
 Helping Underprivileged Medical Aid Network (HUMANe)
 Patient Care Society (PCS)

Zayedians Awareness and Literary Society (ZALS) 
This Society was found by the most active student of Sheikh Zayed Medical College, Muhammad Usman and his team. It helps Spread Awareness on Social Issues using Urdu and English Literature. It organizes Various literary Competitions too. All Pakistan Inter College E-magazine Khud Nawishta خود نوشتہ is also being published under this platform whose Chief Editors are Muhammad Usman and Komal Nazir. Students from educational institutions of all pakistan participate in various categories of Urdu, English, Drawing and Pictorial Sections. It is the most famous E magazine of Pakistan.

Undergraduate Research
The students of SZMC have always been encouraged to do original research, present papers in national & international conferences world wide and get published in peer reviewed journals. One of students of SZMC won Best Paper Presentation Award at 10th Biennial International Physiology Conference of Pakistan Physiological Society held at Liaquat University of Medical & Health Sciences Hyderabad in April 2006. The students of SZMC presented 5 original research papers in 1st SAARC, 11th Biennial International Physiology Conference held at Shifa College of Medicine, Islamabad in November 2008. A student from SZMC presented his paper in 17th International Ain Shams Medical Students Congress in Cairo in February 2009. The students of SZMC have published their original research papers in renowned national journals during their MBBS.

References

External links 
 

Medical colleges in Punjab, Pakistan
Universities and colleges in Rahim Yar Khan
Academic institutions in Pakistan